A scare-line, scare-head, or scare headline is a word or phrase that is presented (often as a quotation and as a headline or other emphasized text, such as a pull quote) to scare the reader, as part of a smear campaign against an opposing political candidate, or to cause an estrangement or cause something to seem unfamiliar in a supernatural way. The term scare quote is sometimes also used to refer to scare-lines that are direct quotations, but more often refers today to use of dismissive quotation marks around a term to imply doubt, irony, or scorn.

Origin of the terms 
The terms scare-line and scare-head derive from scare + headline; the longer name scare headline has sometimes been used.  The Oxford English Dictionary notes the use of the shorter expressions scare-line and scare-head, the latter as early as 1888. The use of scare quote in the same sense dates back to at least 1946. The term scare line also refers to "a means of directing fish towards the main, holding part of a net by frightening the fish into movement", but the term is not well known outside of commercial fishing (and bird hunting, where a similar technique is used to flush birds into flight), so an influence on the journalism term is dubious despite a conceptual similarity.

In newspaper journalism 
Scare-lining increases newspaper sales predictably, and this has been known for several generations.  Upton Sinclair wrote in The Brass Check: A Study of American Journalism (1928): "I knew for instance, sitting at my desk, just how many extra papers I could sell with a scare-line on a police scandal."  The practice has also been criticized as manipulative and of questionable journalistic integrity since the same era.

In modern women's magazines 
Women's magazines, especially from the early 1990s onward, have published an increasing number of "scare stories" about health, most often using alarming headlines and "billboard" text that are not quotations. For example, Glamour magazine in the year 1990 had no health cover stories, but in 2002 had at least one scare-line in almost every issue, e.g. "It's Common, It Can Kill: Why Aren't Doctors Telling Us about This Women-only Disease?" (from the April 2002 issue).  Myrna Blyth, a feminist, media critic, and former editor-in-chief of Ladies' Home Journal, characterizes the trend as the selling of unhappiness and fear about health. Her 2007 book Spin Sisters observes the following, based on one-year, three-year, and ten-year studies of articles in women's magazines:

She concludes that women acting as the effective gatekeepers of family health is why they have been increasingly targeted by this sort of writing and marketing, often based on "confusing, junk-science statistics" and the replacement of rigorous reporting with personal opinion and vague, exaggeratory implications with a lot of "wiggle room".  Such articles also appear to be the leading source of unreasonable fears about vaccines (e.g., the debunked but persistent idea that childhood vaccination causes autism).  Blyth concedes that her own former publication also ran such scare-lines, such as "Dangerous Medicine: When Cures Harm Instead of Heal", and "Foods that Can Kill".

References 

Rhetorical techniques
Propaganda